Events from the year 1668 in England.

Incumbents
 Monarch – Charles II
 Parliament – Cavalier

Events
 17 January – George Villiers, 2nd Duke of Buckingham, fights a duel with Francis Talbot, 11th Earl of Shrewsbury (with whose wife he was having an affair) in which the latter is fatally wounded and a second is killed.
 23 January – England signs the Triple Alliance with the Dutch Republic and Sweden.
 13 February – Charles II mediates a peace treaty between Spain and Portugal.
 13 April – John Dryden becomes Poet Laureate.
 April (traditional date) – Actress Nell Gwyn becomes the King's mistress.
 7 May – Queen Catherine miscarries.
 May – The King's former mistress, Barbara Castlemaine, leaves the Court and is pensioned.
 21 September – The British East India Company takes over Bombay under a Royal Charter of 27 March.
 December – William Penn imprisoned for nearly 8 months in the Tower of London for writing a pamphlet attacking Trinitarian doctrine.

Undated
 The Forest of Dean is re-established as a royal forest.
 Isaac Newton builds the first reflecting telescope (Newton's reflector)
 Richard Duckworth's Tintinnalogia, or, the Art of Ringing, the first work on change ringing, is compiled and published complete by Fabian Stedman in London.
 George Villiers, 2nd Duke of Buckingham, probably originates the field sport of organised fox hunting in England with The Bilsdale Hunt in Yorkshire.
 1668 or 1669 – James, Duke of York, the heir to the throne, secretly takes Eucharist in the Roman Catholic Church.

Births
 November (baptised) – Thomas Woolston, deist (died 1733)
 December (baptised) – Sarah Fyge Egerton, poet (died 1723)
 John Eccles, composer (died 1735)
 Approximate date
 Thomas Archer, baroque architect (died 1743)
 John Poulett, 1st Earl Poulett (died 1743)

Deaths
 21 February – John Thurloe, Puritan spy (born 1616)
 16 March – Francis Talbot, 11th Earl of Shrewsbury (born 1623)
 7 April – Sir William Davenant, poet (born 1606)
 19 September – Sir William Waller, English Civil War general (born c. 1635)
 17 November – Joseph Alleine, English non–conformist preacher (born 1634)
 probable date – Daniel Blagrave, Member of Parliament (born 1603)

References

 
Years of the 17th century in England